Conophytum hammeri is a small, endangered, South African species of succulent plant, of the genus Conophytum.

Description
This species is onion-shaped and single-bodied. It is slow-growing and usually solitary. It forms a protective papery sheath during its dry dormancy. Its pale yellow, nocturnal flowers have 18 to 26 petals. 
It superficially resembles Conophytum burgeri, in being single-bodied and cone-shaped, and has even been hybridised with this species in cultivation. However C. hammeri is smaller and solitary, and has an obscure translucent window on its summit. Other similar, single-bodied Conophytums of the "Cheshire-Feles" section include Conophytum ratum and Conophytum maughanii.

Distribution
This species is indigenous to the northernmost parts of the Northern Cape Province, South Africa. It was first discovered in the 1990s, on gentle quartz-covered slopes in the eastern Richtersveld.

References

Further reading
Hammer,S.(2002) Dumpling and his wife: New views of the genus Conophytum EAE Creative Colour Ltd. .
Hammer,S.(1993) The genus Conophytum : A Conograph Succulent Plant Publications, Pretoria. .
National Botanical Institute of South Africa.(1993) List of Southern African Succulent Plants Umdaus Press.

External links

hammeri
Endemic flora of South Africa
Flora of the Cape Provinces